The British International School Ho Chi Minh City (BIS HCMC) is an international school in Ho Chi Minh City, Vietnam, offering a British style education. The school has three campuses located in Ho Chi Minh City (Saigon). A Primary campus, a Secondary campus, and an Early Years & Infant Campus. They are located in the residential area of District 2 (Thao Dien).  The British International School Ho Chi Minh City was founded in 1997 as Tiny Tots, a Kindergarten. Beginning with only two classes, two overseas teachers and 40 toddlers, it has since grown to become a private day school with over 1,800 students from 52 countries.  The Early Years & Infant Campus caters for students from the Foundation Stage (Pre-school) through to Year 2, the Junior Campus (Primary School) caters for children in Year 3 through to Year 6 and the Secondary campus caters for students from Years 7–13. BIS HCMC has 161 full-time teachers, most of whom are British qualified. BIS HCMC teaches a combination of the National Curriculum of England and International Primary Curriculum (IPC) for the primary students and students take both the International General Certificate of Secondary Education (IGCSE) examinations and the International Baccalaureate Diploma Programme.  BIS is accredited through the Council of International Schools (CIS).  The school is a registered centre for the UK examination boards, Cambridge International Examinations.  It is also designated as an IB World School.  It is a member of the Federation of British International Schools in South Asia (FOBISIA) with the Principal Mr Anthony Rowlands currently holding the position of Chair of FOBISIA.

History
In August 1997, a pre-school named Tiny Tots was established in a villa on Nguyen Van Thu Street in District 1 of Ho Chi Minh City - starting with just two classes, two teachers from overseas and 40 toddlers. Building on this success, a second pre-school named Fundino was soon established in District 3. The original Tiny Tots villa was extended in 2000 to accommodate 10 additional primary classrooms, bringing the total number of students to 300 children. This was the first year the school was officially called the British International School, with Marjorie Hunt being the first Head Teacher.

Two years later, a new Primary campus was built in the residential An Phu area of the city. Alun Thomas was appointed as Principal of the three campuses and enrolment reached 600 children. In August 2005, a purpose-built Secondary campus was opened on land very close to the new Primary campus in An Phu.

In August 2007, another new Primary campus was built on Tu Xuong Street in District 3, combining the Nguyen Van Thu campus and the Fundino campus into one new school. Mr Shaun Williams was appointed as Principal, and the school roll rose to 1,350 children, with ages ranging from 2 to 18.

In 2008, an extension to the An Phu Primary campus was opened followed by an extension to the An Phu Secondary campus in August 2010. These extensions provided additional classrooms and specialist facilities allowing the school to grow towards its projected target of 2,000 students.

In 2015, the British International School Ho Chi Minh City merged with Nord Anglia Education (NAE), a schools organisation located across China, Europe, the Middle East, North America and Southeast Asia. 

In 2017, the Primary campus in Tu Xuong was closed due to budget deficits causing the two primary schools (Tu Xuong and An Phu) to be merged.

In 2018, BIS HCMC opened their specialist Early Years & Infant Campus facility down the road from the Junior and Secondary Campuses in District 2, closing the Tu Xuong Campus in District 3 and uniting the whole school community in one central location in Thao Dien.

Inter-school involvements
Inter-house sporting competitions and fixtures against other schools in Ho Chi Minh City occur on a regular basis as well as regional games.  The school is also involved in the Federation of British International Schools in Asia (FOBISIA), with sports and music.

BIS was the founding school of SAIMUN (HCMC Model United Nations).  SAIMUN is the only MUN conference held in Vietnam, and was established in 2009. In addition, BIS established and hosted the 1st Annual FOBISIA MUN 2010.

BIS is also the host of the annual ABRSM High Scorers' Concerts in Ho Chi Minh City, which feature the top 25 scoring musicians.

References

Ho Chi Minh City
United Kingdom–Vietnam relations
International schools in Ho Chi Minh City
Cambridge schools in Vietnam
International Baccalaureate schools in Vietnam